Brooke's Point, officially the Municipality of Brooke's Point,  is a 1st class municipality in the province of Palawan, Philippines. According to the 2020 census, it has a population of 73,994 people.

It is named after Sir James Brooke. The name has now come under critical review, with some branding the naming of the municipality as "white worship" and the persistence of colonial mentality amidst Filipino sovereignty. City officials have also demanded that the original name of the municipality, Bonbon (sometimes written as Bon-Bon), be restored.

The Pearl of Lao Tzu or the Pearl of Allah, formerly considered the world's largest pearl, was found in its waters on May 7, 1934.

History

Originally known as Bonbon by the Filipinos, the current name of Brooke's Point comes from Englishman Sir James Brooke, described as "the first white Rajah" of Sarawak and founder of the Brooke Dynasty. It is believed that during one of his voyages, he landed on the tip of an island with a long narrow stretch of land inhabited by Palaweños and Muslims under the Sultanate of Sulu. During American rule, American scouts named the place Brooke's Point.

On June 28, 1949, the Municipality of Brooke's Point was created by virtue of Executive Order No. 232 by then-President Elpidio Quirino.

The pioneer families who settled in Brooke's Point are the Villapa, Rodriguez, Setias, Valencia, Aspiras, Arzaga and Edwards families.

Geography
It has a total land area of  stretching about  along the length of Palawan. Brooke's Point is bounded by Sofronio Española in the north, Bataraza in the south, Rizal in the west, and the Sulu Sea in the east. The municipalities of Bataraza, Sofronio Española and parts of Rizal and Quezon were once a part of Brooke's Point.

Barangays
Brooke's Point is subdivided into 18 barangays, two urban (Poblacion I and Poblacion II) and 16 rural. Samariñana was separated from Tanionbog in 1954.

Climate

Trivia

The First Woman Mayor of Brooke's Point is Irenea Mariano Setias (Appointed)

Demographics

Religion
The town is predominantly Christian, with a sizable Muslim population.

Most are Catholics. Other Christian denominations include Church of God International, Iglesia ni Cristo, Jehovah's Witnesses, the Church of Jesus Christ of Latter-day Saints (LDS Church) and others.

The Catholic Church is located north of the town center while the Evangelical Christian Churches are the Gospel Hall, located north of the town center, the Iglesia ni Cristo, south of the municipal hall, the Church of Christ International's building is located in Old Camp while the LDS Church chapel is in Edward's Subdivision.

Economy

Brooke's Point is one of Palawan's main economic centers outside Puerto Princesa, along with Narra, Coron and Cuyo. The town is home to several banks including the Land Bank and Rural Bank of Brooke's Point. Money transfer companies such as Western Union and MoneyGram also have branches in the town. There are several pawnshops like M Lhullier, Cebuana Lhuillier, among others. The town also has a Mercury Drug and a Generic Pharmacy.

Commercial Enterprises are thriving. There are many medium-sized stores, located mostly in the town proper. The service sector is also growing with the rise of many commercial establishments. The town's economy is based primarily on agriculture. The town produces great quantities of rice, copra and corn. The palm oil industry is headquartered in Barangay Mainit in the south.  Unlike most of Palawan's towns, Brooke's Point does not have white and pristine beaches that draw local and foreign tourists. But because of abundant freshwater resources, the town is one of the most productive in the province in terms of agriculture. Many fruits and vegetables grow in abundance.

In addition, the town is also one of the Philippines' gateways to Southeast Asia. Its proximity to Sabah is a strategic advantage, but the lack of infrastructure and an inter-governmental agreement between Malaysia and the Philippines hinders the town from being a trading hub. There is minimal trade with Malaysia through many of the town's Muslim and Christian residents who have relatives in Sabah.  The town is supposed to become an international port with cargo services to Sabah and Brunei.

Infrastructure

Transportation
Brooke's Point has a modern seaport that serves many cargo ships from Manila, Mindanao, the Visayas and other parts of Luzon. The port also caters to numerous fishing vessels. Commercial vessels from Malaysia, Indonesia and other countries also make frequent stops in the port. The port also serves as a docking point for vessels containing commercial goods from Manila and abroad, and also mining-related materials to Rio Tuba. The port of Brooke's Point is considered as one of the most profitable ports in the southern Philippines.

The El Nido-Bataraza highway connects the town to other mainland towns and municipalities. Transportation between Puerto Princesa and Brooke's Point is through commercial vans, buses or jeepneys. There is also a private airport located at Lada. Transportation throughout the town is through tricycle and multi-cabs. Kuliglig, a machine also used for agriculture, is widely used as a means of transportation in rural areas.

Healthcare
Health facilities in the municipality include a 25-bed-capacity secondary government hospital, the Southern Palawan Provincial Hospital; a Rural Health Unit (RHU); Barangay Health Stations (BHS); and private clinics and hospitals. Dental and optical clinics, laboratories, and drugstores are also present and serve not only Brooke's Point, but also neighboring municipalities.

Currently there are three private hospitals.

Education
The Palawan State University has its campus in Brooke's Point. In addition to this, the town is also home to Southern Palawan College, Inc. which offers several technical and vocational courses.

There are 9 secondary schools in Brooke's Point. Brooke's Point Christian High School, a Christian-run institution, and the Sacred Heart of Jesus High School administered by the Augustinians are located in the town center. Public secondary schools include the Brooke's Point National High School, Governor Abueg Memorial and Vocational High school, and more. There are also at least 40 public elementary schools.

Media
Brooke's Point has three radio stations: Radyo Natin Brooke's Point, Palawan, Radyo Mo Nationwide and RadioPoint911 that broadcasts to Balabac, Bataraza, Sofronio Española, Rizal, Palawan, and some parts of Quezon, Palawan and Narra. Brooke's Point, along with Coron and Puerto Princesa City, is a site of GMA Network's satellite transmission center. The town is also a telecommunications hub for several companies such as Smart and Globe networks. Internet cafes are becoming increasingly popular, while the percentage of personal computer ownership is also rising.

Environmental issues
Many parts of the town's forests are cleared to give way for agriculture. Slash and burn agriculture is a common practice in the town's interior. Burning of garbage and waste are common, as is illegal fishing. Illegal logging is done on a small basis, but it has a substantial impact on the town's forest cover. Small-scale illegal pet trade also exists. Mynahs, parrots and pangolins, as well as many animals found only in Palawan, are poached and traded to other parts of the country and abroad. Although the practice is increasingly common, many of these activities are not known to authorities.

In recent years, the local government along with the National government has enacted several policies and programs to protect the environment. But apathy and corruption hinder government efforts to implement these policies and programs.

References

External links

 Brooke's Point Profile at PhilAtlas.com
Official site
 [ Philippine Standard Geographic Code]
Philippine Census Information
Local Governance Performance Management System

Municipalities of Palawan
Establishments by Philippine executive order